Curtis Amy (October 11, 1929 – June 5, 2002) was an American jazz saxophonist.

Biography
Amy was born in Houston, Texas, United States. He learned how to play clarinet before joining the Army, and during his time in service, picked up the tenor saxophone. After his discharge, he attended and graduated from Kentucky State College. He worked as an educator in Tennessee while playing in midwestern jazz clubs. In the mid-1950s, he relocated to Los Angeles and later signed with Pacific Jazz Records, often playing with organist Paul Bryant. In the mid-1960s, he spent three years as musical director of Ray Charles' orchestra, together with his wife, Merry Clayton, and Steve Huffsteter.

As well as leading his own bands and recording albums under his own name, Amy did session work and played the solos on several recordings, including The Doors song "Touch Me", Carole King's Tapestry, and Lou Rawls' first albums, Black and Blue and Tobacco Road, coinciding with Dexter Gordon in the Onzy Matthews big band, as well as working with Marvin Gaye, Tammy Terrell and Smokey Robinson.

Up until his death, he was married to singer and recording artist Merry Clayton. Their son, Kevin Amy has also pursued a musical career.

Discography

As leader
 The Blues Message (Pacific Jazz, 1960)
 Meetin' Here (Pacific Jazz, 1961)
 Groovin' Blue (Pacific Jazz, 1961)
 Tippin' on Through (Pacific Jazz, 1962)
 Way Down (Pacific Jazz, 1962)
 Katanga! (Pacific Jazz, 1963)
 The Sounds of Broadway/The Sounds of Hollywood (Palomar, 1965)
 Mustang (Verve, 1966)
 Jungle Adventure in Music and Sound (Coliseum, 1966)
 Peace For Love (Fresh Sounds 1994)

As sideman
With Dizzy Gillespie
Jazz Recital (Norgran, 1956)

With Carole King
Tapestry (Ode, 1971)

With The Doors ~ 
the saxophone solo on their hit "Touch Me"

With Lou Rawls
Black and Blue (Capitol, 1963)
Tobacco Road (Capitol, 1963)

With Gerald Wilson 
On Stage (Pacific Jazz, 1965)
Feelin' Kinda Blues (Pacific Jazz, 1965)

References

External links 
 Article at All About Jazz

1929 births
2002 deaths
20th-century American male musicians
20th-century American saxophonists
African-American jazz musicians
American jazz clarinetists
American jazz flautists
American jazz tenor saxophonists
American male saxophonists
Burials at Inglewood Park Cemetery
Cool jazz saxophonists
Hard bop saxophonists
American male jazz musicians
Soul-jazz saxophonists
Verve Records artists
West Coast jazz saxophonists
20th-century African-American musicians
21st-century African-American people
20th-century flautists